Alloclemensia minima is a moth of the family Incurvariidae. It was described by Kozlov in 1987. It is found in Russia.

References

Moths described in 1987
Incurvariidae